Peru–Russia relations is the bilateral foreign relations between Peru and Russia.  Peru has an embassy in Moscow and an honorary consulate in Saint Petersburg. Russia has an embassy in Lima and an honorary consulate in the San Isidro District.

Both countries are full members of the APEC.

Background

History
Peru and Russia first established relations under Peruvian President Miguel de San Román, who reached out to Tsar Alexander II through a letter with the intention of beginning a process of establishing relations between the two countries. It was only in 1873 however that a Peruvian delegation would travel to the country, with bilateral relations being officially established on May 16, 1874. The two countries would then work together with Russia supplying Peru with military equipment and both countries benefiting from mutual trade.

Recent history
The Soviet Union established diplomatic relations with Peru on February 1, 1969. A year later, Peru saw itself affected by an earthquake that deeply affected the Áncash region. As a response, the Soviet Union dispatched a large amount of humanitarian aid. During the transport of said aid, one Antonov An-22 crashed, killing all on board. This event as well as the general trans-continental assistance was critical in improving relations between both countries, with the embassy of Peru in Moscow celebrating on July 18 the Day of Russo-Peruvian Solidarity. The Peruvian Armed Forces use Russian equipment such as Kalashnikov rifles and MiG-29 jet fighters.

On November 13, 2010, Peru and Russia signed a visa suppression agreement which came into effect on June 21, 2011.

Diplomatic Missions 
  has an embassy in Moscow.
  has an embassy in Lima.

See also 

 Foreign relations of Peru
 Foreign relations of Russia
 List of ambassadors of Russia to Peru
 List of ambassadors of Peru to Russia
 1970 Atlantic Ocean Antonov An-22 crash

References

 
Bilateral relations of Russia
Russia